The 1946–47 Indiana Hoosiers men's basketball team represented Indiana University. After returning from serving as a lieutenant in the Navy during World War II, Branch McCracken resumed the head coaching position for a 6th year. The team played its home games in The Fieldhouse in Bloomington, Indiana, and was a member of the Big Nine Conference.

The Hoosiers finished the regular season with an overall record of 12–8 and a conference record of 8–4, finishing 2nd in the Big Nine Conference. Indiana was not invited to participate in any postseason tournament.

Roster

Schedule/Results

|-
!colspan=8| Regular season
|-

References

Indiana Hoosiers
Indiana Hoosiers men's basketball seasons
1946 in sports in Indiana
1947 in sports in Indiana